Baotou is the largest city by urban population in Inner Mongolia, China. Governed as a prefecture-level city, as of the 2020 census, its built-up (or metro) area made up of its 5 urban districts is home to 2,261,089 people with a total population of 2,709,378 accounting for counties under its jurisdiction. The city's namesake, literally translated to "place with deer", is of Mongolic origin or "Lucheng", meaning "City of Deer". Alternatively Baotou is known as the "City of Steel in Gobi".

Previously the town's principal industry was steel. However, in recent decades Baotou has become internationally known for processing rare earth minerals mined in  Bayan Obo, making the city the largest Chinese source of the minerals. Though central to the city's economy, it also produces toxic tailings contained by the Baotou Tailings Dam .

History

Ancient times
The area now known as Baotou was inhabited by nomads, some of whose descendants would later be categorized as Mongols. Near the end of the Han Dynasty—206 BC–220 AD—Lü Bu, a particularly noteworthy warrior, was born in today's Jiuyuan District of Baotou.

Foundation of the town
Compared to the capital of Inner Mongolia, Hohhot, Baotou's construction as a city came relatively late, being incorporated as a town in 1809. The city's site was chosen because it was in an arable region of the Yellow River's Great Bend.

Early 20th century

The Gelaohui secret society and the Hui Muslim General Ma Fuxiang came to an agreement in 1922, in which Ma Fuxiang agreed to allow the Gelaohui to extort protection money from wool merchants in Baotou.

A railway from Beijing was constructed in 1923, and the city began spurring some industrial sites. A German-Chinese joint-venture in 1934 constructed the Baotou Airport and opened a weekly route connecting Baotou with Ningxia and Lanzhou.

When young Owen Lattimore visited Baotou in 1925, it was still "a little husk of a town in a great hollow shell of mud ramparts, where two busy streets made a traders' quarter", but already an important railhead. Qinghai and Gansu wool and hides were brought down the Yellow River by raft and boat from Lanzhou to Baotou, and shipped from Baotou by rail to the east (in particular, to Tianjin for export). The river traffic was one-way only, however, as the fast current made sailing up the Yellow River impractical. To travel from Baotou back to Lanzhou or Yinchuan, one would use a cart and camel road. There were also caravan roads from Baotou to Ordos and the Alxa League.

Second Sino-Japanese War
Baotou was under Japanese control from 1937 until 1945.

Chinese civil war
On September 19, 1949, after the September 19 Rebellion, Baotou fell under Communist control. The People's Government was formed in February 1950.

Late 20th century
In the early Communist years Baotou served as an industrial centre, with a significant portion of its economy coming from its steel production. The Iron and Steel Base in Baotou is one of the "156 projects", which were constructed with the help of Soviet Union to develop China's national economy in the 1950s and 1960s, and it continues this reputation until this day.

1996 earthquake

On 3 May 1996, at 03:32AM UTC (11:32AM local time), an earthquake of MS 6.4 occurred. Since the epicenter of the earthquake was located close to the city, Baotou was very damaged by the earthquake: 26 people were killed, 453 injured and 196,633 lost their homes. The electrical infrastructure of the city was also damaged, and soil liquefaction occurred around the swamps of the Yellow River.

The earthquake, which destroyed many old houses, led to the reconstruction of Baotou. In 2002, the Baotou Municipal Government was awarded by UN-HABITAT for the improvements in shelter and the urban environments.

21st century 
In the early 21st century, Baotou's economy grew rapidly, growing about tenfold from 2000 to 2010. The city's gross domestic product peaked at about 386.763 billion renminbi (RMB) in 2016, and has shrunk significantly since then.

Economy
Baotou is the largest economy of the Inner Mongolia Autonomous Region, and accounted for approximately 21.3% of Inner Mongolia's total gross domestic product (GDP) as of 2012. As of 2018, the city's GDP of 295.180 billion renminbi (RMB), a 7.22% increase from the previous year, but much lower than the city's peak of 386.763 billion RMB in 2016.

Baotou's secondary sector has proven crucial to the city's economy. As of 2016, it contributed 182.215 RMB to the city's economy, 47.11% of the city's total GDP. However, like the city's total economy, it has shrunk since then. As of 2020, the city's secondary sector contributed 115.300 billion RMB to Baotou's economy.

Baotou Xingsheng Economic & Technological Development Zone is an industrial zone in Baotou.

The city processes ore from the mines in Bayan Obo, the greatest source of rare-earth metals globally. In 2005, they accounted for 45% of the total production on earth. The tailings ponds from the complex hydro-metallurgical and acid processing results in significant local water and land pollution. Both humans and animals have had disease because of this contamination.

As noted, in the early Communist years Baotou served as an industrial centre, with a significant portion of its economy coming from its industry around metals, mostly steel. The Iron and Steel Base of Bautou was constructed with the help of the Soviet Union to help China in developing its economy; It is one of those 156 projects that the Soviets helped building for that purpose in the 1950s and 1960s.

Demographics
According to the 2020 Chinese Census, Baotou has a permanent population of about 2,709,400 people, up about 59,000 from the 2010 Census. The average household in Baotou comprises 2.27 people, down from 2.65 as of 2010.

Age and sex distribution 
Baotou, like many places in China, has an aging population. As per the 2020 Census, 20.19% of Baotou's population is aged 60 and older, 1.49 percentage points above the Chinese national average of 18.70%. 13.70% of Baotou's population is aged 65 and older, 0.20 percentage points above the Chinese national average of 13.50%. The number of people aged 60 and older has grown by 7.42% since 2010, and the number of people aged 65 and older has grown by 4.88% during that same span.

Per the census, 50.7% of the city's population is male, and 49.3% is female.

Ethnic groups

Floating population 
As of 2020, there are approximately 1,026,400 floating residents of Baotou, that is, residents of the city with a hukou registration elsewhere. This population has increased by 144,100, or 22.37%, since 2010.

Urbanization 
As of the 2020 Census, 2,334,400 people, or 86.16% of the city's population, lives in urban areas. The remaining 375,000 people, 13.84% of the city's population, lives in rural areas.

Prominent locations
The 39,000 capacity Baotou Olympic Sports Centre Stadium() is the main sports venue in the city and is used mostly for football matches.

Saihantalah Grasslands Park or Ecological Reserve is a large urban park in central Baotou, in the Qingshan district. The 5.5 km square park is home to thirty wild animal and bird species and is reputedly one of the largest urban parks in China. It is a popular recreational location and attracts 2 million visitors a year.
The largest Tibetan Buddhist monastery in Inner Mongolia, Badekar Monastery is located in Shiguai District.
The Baotou Tailings Dam or Weikuang Dam is a tailings dam about 20 kilometres outside the main city of Baotou. It is owned by Baotou Steel and contains the waste from rare earth mineral refineries. In 2015, BBC journalist Tim Maughan wrote that the dam was a "toxic lake" and the area like "hell on earth." He said he was unable to tell where the refineries ended and the city began. He compared the city to images in the movie Tron, where "the side streets are filled with drunk, vomiting refinery workers that spill from bars and barbecue joints." In 2016, serious contamination of farming land in the dam's immediate vicinity was formally identified by Chinese researchers. The rare earth minerals are mined in Bayan Obo Mining District, about 120 kilometres from Baotou and are used in the manufacture of many modern electronics, including smartphones, TVs and wind turbines.

Transportation
Baotou is a terminus for both the Baolan Railway and the Jingbao Railway, heading for Lanzhou in the west and Beijing in the east, respectively. The city is served by two main railway stations, Baotou East Railway Station, and Baotou Railway Station.
Baotou Donghe Airport serves the city with regular service to Beijing, Shanghai and Hong Kong.
The city is connected by the Hubao Expressway to Inner Mongolia's capital, Hohhot.
China National Highway 210
Baotou Metro

Geography and climate
Baotou is located in the west of Inner Mongolia, located at the junction of two economic zones: the Bohai Economic Rim and the Upper Yellow River Natural Resources Enrichment Zone. The Tumochuan Plateau, Hetao Plateau, and Yin Mountains cross the urban area and central part of the prefecture. Baotou City ranges in latitude from 41° 20' to 42° 40' N and in longitude from 109° 50' to 111° 25' E.

Baotou features a cold semi-arid climate (Köppen BSk), marked by long, cold and very dry winters, hot, somewhat humid summers, and strong winds, especially in spring. Temperatures often fall below  in winter and rise above  in summer. Due to the aridity and elevation, temperature differences between day and night can be large, especially in spring. In 2002, there were 12 instances of dust storms.

Administrative divisions 
Baotou is divided into 10 county-level divisions, including 7 districts, 1 county and 2 banners.

Gallery

References

External links

 
 Baotou official website

 
Cities in Inner Mongolia
Prefecture-level divisions of Inner Mongolia
National Forest Cities in China